Jason Oliver Lavigilante is a Mauritian boxer. At the 2012 Summer Olympics, he competed in the Men's flyweight, but was defeated in the first round by Duke Micah.

References

External links
 

Year of birth missing (living people)
Living people
Olympic boxers of Mauritius
Boxers at the 2012 Summer Olympics
Flyweight boxers
Mauritian male boxers